Diego Montoya may refer to:

Sportspeople 
Diego Montoya (cyclist), Colombian road racing cyclist, see 2006 Vuelta a Colombia
Diego Montoya (footballer), with Bolivian club Nacional Potosí
Diego Montoya (racing driver), former Colombian racing driver

Others
Diego León Montoya Sánchez, Colombian drug trafficker
 Diego Montoya (artist)
 Diego Montoya Mendoza